The I-35W/US 10/I-694 North Central Corridor Reconstruction Project was a road construction project, conducted under the operations of the Minnesota Department of Transportation (MnDOT). This project involved the partial or complete reconstruction of three major thoroughfares in the northern and eastern Twin Cities metropolitan area, which include Interstate 35W (I-35W), US Highway 10, and I-694. Ramsey County Road 10 (CR 10) was also planned to be partially reconstructed at the intersection with I-35W during this project as well. Several other side projects that tie into this reconstruction include the expansion of the Lexington Avenue bridge in Arden Hills, as well as the reconstruction of the Island Lake overpasses just west of Victoria Street in Shoreview. Cities and communities that are involved with this project include New Brighton, Mounds View, Arden Hills, Shoreview, Little Canada, and Vadnais Heights, Minnesota.

Construction on the North Central Corridor project began the week of September 19, 2011. Work is expected to be completed in November 2013, at an estimated cost of $185.5 million.

Project background
Road grading involved in constructing the original Highway 100 (I-694)/US 10/MN 51 interchange was approved in 1956, with actual road construction beginning in 1959. The bridges that span the project area were built in 1960, 1961, and 1962, respectively. The first section of Interstate 694 opened to traffic between Interstate 35E and Rice Street in 1961, and the remainder of I-694, I-35W, and US 10, were opened to traffic later in the 1960s and 1970s. Projects to expand I-694 between I-94 and I-35W were completed during the late part of the 1980s. Since then, the Unweave the Weave project (completed in 2008) has been the only major construction activity that has taken place on I-694 other than routine maintenance.

Currently, I-694 provides for a minimum of two through lanes of traffic each direction both east and west of the I-694/US 10/MN 51 interchange. The area between I-35W and I-35E, however, is only a total of four lanes wide, with just one lane of through traffic provided for commuters on I-694 at the interchange. This lane configuration, combined with increased traffic volume and congestion over time, makes the interchange one of the worst places for bottlenecks in the Twin Cities. Traffic data, collected as of 2000, noted that approximately 102,000 vehicles travel through this stretch of I-694 on a daily basis. Based on this data, this number is expected to increase to 148,000 by the year 2030. The interchange also experiences an average of two hours of congestion during both the morning and afternoon rush hour periods. One of the key objectives of this project is to allow for I-694 to be a continuous six-lane freeway from the junction with I-494 in Maple Grove to the junction with I-94 in Oakdale.

Project objectives and design goals
The I-35W/US 10/I-694 North Central Corridor Reconstruction Project aims to accomplish the following design aspects and project goals:

 Eliminate geometric deficiencies (traffic weaving) at the I-694/US 10/MN 51 interchange, including removal of the Hamline Avenue exit and left-hand entrances at Hamline Avenue and MN 51. Construction will be staged to allow two lanes of traffic to remain open in each direction throughout reconstruction of the interchange.
 Increase traffic capacity by providing additional through lanes in each direction of I-694.
 Allow I-694 to be a continuous six-lane highway, both east and west of I-35W.
 Replace structurally deficient or functionally obsolete bridges throughout project area. Most of the bridge structures throughout the I-694/US 10/MN 51 project area received a structural evaluation score of 5 or 6, classifying them as being close to structurally deficient. Other bridges are scheduled for replacement on I-35W, and on MN 51, as noted below:
The CR 10 bridges spanning I-35W are scheduled for replacement beginning in June 2012, and will be completed by the end of October 2012.
The CR 96 bridge spanning I-35W was scheduled to be repaired in 2014. (MnDOT is only planning to replace the bridge deck and superstructure components of the CR 96 bridge.)
The CR H bridge spanning I-35W is scheduled for replacement in 2015.
The CR F (Valentine Lake Road) bridge spanning I-35W is scheduled for replacement in 2016.
The CR E2 bridge spanning I-35W is scheduled for replacement in 2016.
The CR E bridge spanning MN 51 (Snelling Avenue) is scheduled for replacement in 2015.
 Expand or reconstruct overpasses and ramps on I-694 at Rice Street, Victoria Street, and Lexington Avenue. Two of these overpasses include the Island Lake channel bridges that span Island Lake, just west of Victoria Street, in Shoreview.
 Reconstruct the I-35W interchange at I-694. Current draft plans show this interchange with two flyover ramps on the NE and SW corners of the interchange.
 Resurface the roadway on US 10 between I-694 and I-35W.
 Construct a partial diamond interchange on US 10 at CR 96 in Arden Hills. The current configuration of this interchange is an at-grade intersection; future plan is to build an overpass on CR 96 to span US 10. This construction is planned for March 2013 – September 2013.

Construction breakdown
Initial design plans for the North Central Corridor Reconstruction Project were drawn in 2007. These plans included expanding I-694 to a total of eight lanes wide (four each direction), but a lack of funding forced these plans to be scaled back to a six-lane freeway (three in each direction). After several revisions, final design plans were signed in November 2010. Preparations for construction took place in the months preceding September 2011.

2011
Construction officially commenced on September 19, 2011. Work started on I-694 with grading inside the median west of US 10 to make way for new permanent pavement between I-35W and US 10.

On October 2, southbound Hamline Avenue was closed to traffic at CR F. MnDOT also permanently closed the ramp from southbound Hamline Avenue to eastbound I-694.

During the weekend of October 7, the eastbound I-694 bridge spanning Old US 10 (currently signed as CR 76) was demolished. Beams for the new bridge were put into place on November 8.

MnDOT demolished the ramp from southbound Hamline Avenue to eastbound I-694 on October 14. This involved closing off the westbound side of I-694 for one weekend while the parent demolition of the southbound Hamline Avenue bridge over westbound I-694 took place.

The 2011 construction season came to a close on November 8, 2011.

2012
Activity for the 2012 construction season resumed the week of March 18.

Lexington Avenue Bridge Expansion
Work on the expansion of the Lexington Avenue bridge began on May 7. The bridge was expanded to increase traffic flow by converting to dual left turn lanes for both directions of I-694, update the traffic signaling system, and allow for a bicycle/pedestrian lane on the east side of the bridge. Work on the southbound half of the bridge was completed on May 17. The northbound (east) side of the bridge was reconstructed during the month of June, and all work on the bridge was completed in mid-July.

Interstate 35W/CR 10/US 10 Interchange Reconstruction
On June 8, MnDOT closed I-35W in both directions between I-694 and the northern junction of US 10 for removal of the bridges at the southern junction of US 10/CR 10. On September 20, crews opened the reconstructed bridge spans to cross traffic (all on- and off-ramps had remained closed up to this point). Work completed on October 26 with the reopening of the ramps from northbound I-35W to westbound CR 10, and from southbound I-35W to eastbound US 10.

Interstate 694/MN 51/Hamline Avenue Interchange Reconstruction
MnDOT closed the ramp from northbound MN 51 to westbound I-694 on April 2. MN 51 at the time was open as far north as CR E, with access limited to local traffic at Grey Fox Road in Arden Hills. Conversely, Hamline Avenue was closed south of CR F. The loop ramp from northbound MN 51 to westbound I-694 opened to traffic the week of November 15, 2012. The other loop ramp from northbound MN 51 to westbound US 10 will reopen during the 2013 construction season. Also, MN 51 and Hamline Avenue reopened in both directions (northbound and southbound) at I-694 as of November 15.

The ramp from westbound I-694 to northbound Hamline Avenue was permanently closed on April 10. To access Hamline Avenue, motorists must now exit at Lexington Avenue and proceed westbound on CR F.

On May 14, MnDOT closed the ramp from eastbound I-694 to southbound MN 51 for reconstruction. Eastbound US 10 from CR 96 to eastbound I-694 was also closed on May 14. The ramp to southbound MN 51 reopened during the week of November 15; eastbound US 10 south of CR 96 remains closed through spring of 2013.

The intersection of Hamline Avenue at CR F was closed to traffic October 1. This allowed workers to install the wiring and other components for a new traffic signal that will be installed in the spring of 2013.

Island Lake Bridge Reconstruction
Sheet pile installation took place in the weeks leading up to April 1 in preparation for work on two new bridges that would span Island Lake in Shoreview. Sheet piling was used in this project to minimize environmental impacts from construction work and acted as a barrier between the construction area and the clean area of the lake. Because of the sheet pile installation and the nature of the remainder of the bridge work, boat traffic was halted until the majority of the bridge work was completed.

Work started with the reconstruction of the westbound span, which went through early August. The Victoria Street ramp to westbound I-694 was closed from June 8 through August 20 as the westbound bridge span was completed.

Work then continued on the eastbound span in mid-August. The ramp from eastbound I-694 to Victoria Street was closed on August 22. Crews poured the bridge deck on the eastbound span September 22. The ramp to Victoria Street was reopened on October 14, 2012.

2017
The project was completed with the finishing of the Arden hills portion by November 2017.

Construction photos and original highway configuration videos
Below is a sampling of photos of current and previous construction activities throughout the I-35W/US 10/I-694/MN 51 reconstruction project area.

Also, two separate YouTube videos were filmed showing the lane configuration of Interstate 694 going both westbound and eastbound through the project area.

See also

References

External links
Project website

Interstate Highways in Minnesota
U.S. Highways in Minnesota
Interstate 35
U.S. Route 10